Hardtberghalle is an indoor sporting arena that is located in Bonn, Germany. The capacity of the arena is 3,500 people. It was home to the Telekom Baskets Bonn basketball team until the Telekom Dome opened in 2008.

References

Indoor arenas in Germany
Sport in Bonn
Sports venues in North Rhine-Westphalia
Buildings and structures in Bonn